01011001 is the seventh studio album by Arjen Anthony Lucassen's long-running Ayreon project. "01011001" is the binary representation of the ASCII value of the letter Y.

01011001 is a concept album that tells the story of aliens called the "Forever", who create humanity, only to later endanger it by providing it with technology.

Seventeen singers in total, including Lucassen himself, contributed to the album, more than any other Ayreon album. Apart from Lucassen, only Anneke van Giersbergen (ex-The Gathering) and Floor Jansen (After Forever, Nightwish) had sung on previous Ayreon albums, on Into the Electric Castle and Universal Migrator Part 1: The Dream Sequencer respectively.

It also stars, among others, Bob Catley from Magnum, Hansi Kürsch from Blind Guardian, Jørn Lande, and Steve Lee from Gotthard in his final guest appearance before his death in 2010. The album was a commercial and critical success.

Reception 

AllMusic reviewer Cosmo Lee praised the album, saying that it has "pristine production [and] byzantine songs that feel like full albums." He went on to say that "Music this over the top almost defies criticism. Reviewing it is like reviewing the world's tallest building. It doesn't care; it just goes on and on." Exclaim's Laura Wiebe Taylor felt that the album had some great songs, such as "Liquid Eternity" and "E=mc2," but that some of the other songs were weaker, including "Newborn Race" and "Web of Lies." She concluded her review by saying that "ultimately, 01011001 is a hard rock extravaganza."

Chad Bower, in his review for About.com, said that 01011001 "has something for everyone," and that the album is "a musical tour de force that takes the listener on a musical journey with an interesting storyline and very well-written songs." Record Collector's Tim Jones noted the differing styles of the album's songs, saying that "The Truth is in Here" is similar to the music of Blackmore's Night, that "River of Time" is reminiscent of Jethro Tull, and that "Beneath the Waves" reminded him of Pink Floyd.

Track listing

Personnel 

Vocalists
Bob Catley (Magnum) – Forever
Tom S. Englund (Evergrey) – Forever
Anneke van Giersbergen (ex-The Gathering) – Forever
Daniel Gildenlöw (Pain of Salvation) – Forever
Floor Jansen (Nightwish | ex-After Forever) – Forever
Hansi Kürsch (Blind Guardian) – Forever
Jørn Lande (ex-Masterplan) – Forever
Steve Lee (Gotthard) – Forever
Magali Luyten – Forever
Jonas Renkse (Katatonia) – Forever
Arjen Anthony Lucassen – Mr. L on "The Truth Is in Here", and backing vocals on "Connect the Dots"
Liselotte Hegt (Dial) – Mr. L's nurse on "The Truth Is in Here"
Simone Simons (Epica) – Simone on "Web of Lies"
Ty Tabor (King's X) – an average middle-class worker on "Connect the Dots"
Marjan Welman – a 21st-century scientist on "E=mc2"
Wudstik – a 21st-century scientist on "E=mc2"
Phideaux Xavier – PX on "Web of Lies"

Instrumentalists
Tomas Bodin (The Flower Kings) – synthesizer solo on "Waking Dreams"
Joost van den Broek (After Forever) – synthesizer solo and piano on "The Sixth Extinction"
David Faber – cellos
Jeroen Goossens – flute; soprano and tenor recorder on "The Truth Is in Here"; bass flute on "Unnatural Selection"; tin whistle on "River of Time"
Lori Linstruth – guitar solo on "Newborn Race"
Arjen Anthony Lucassen – electric and acoustic guitars, bass guitars, mandolin, keyboards, synthesizers, Hammond, and Solina
Ben Mathot – violins
Michael Romeo (Symphony X) – guitar solo on "E=mc2"
Derek Sherinian (ex-Dream Theater) – synthesizer solo on "The Fifth Extinction"
Ed Warby – drums and percussion

Production
Arjen Anthony Lucassen – recording, production, mixing, and mastering
Joost van den Broek – engineering assistant
Jef Bertels – cover painting
Yvette Boertje – image for "The Truth Is in Here"
Felipe Machado Franco – lay-out and illustrations
Simone van Vegten – 3D illustrations

Charts

References

External links 
 

2008 albums
Ayreon albums
Rock operas
Inside Out Music albums
Science fiction concept albums